Don't Turn Around is the debut album by American soul/R&B vocal group, Black Ivory. The album was produced and arranged by record producer, Patrick Adams. and released in March 1972 on Today Records/Perception Records

Album information
Black Ivory's debut single, "Don't Turn Around" (written by Patrick Adams) was released in April 1971 and peaked at No. 38 on the Billboard R&B/Soul singles chart in January 1972. The single along with the B-side, "I Keep Asking You Questions" was recorded at Sigma Sound Studio in Philadelphia, Pennsylvania. Two more singles were released, "You and I" (Written by Leroy Burgess and Stuart Bascombe), and "I'll Find a Way" (written by Black Ivory and Patrick Adams). "You and I" peaked at No. 32 on the Billboard Soul/R&B singles chart, while "I'll Find a Way" peaked at No. 46 on the same chart. The album spent 19 weeks on the Billboard R&B albums chart, peaking at No. 13 in May 1972. The album crossed-over to Billboard‘s 200 chart peaking at No. 158.

Other songs on the album include the B-side to "Don't Turn Around", the upbeat tempo song, "I Keep Asking You Questions", written by Black Ivory and Patrick Adams; and a cover to Michael Jackson's hit single, "Got to Be There", written by Elliot Willensky.

Track listing

Personnel
Black Ivory
Leroy Burgess - vocals 
Stuart Bascombe - vocals 
Russell Patterson – vocals

Production
All songs were produced, conducted and arranged by Patrick Adams

Vocal arrangements by Leroy Burgess
String arrangements on "If I Could Be A Mirror, by Leroy Burgess

Don’t Turn Around/I Keep Asking You Questions (Singles)

Patrick Adams, Robert Ayers: Piano
Val Burke: Bass
Norman Harris & Patrick Adams: Guitar
Arnold Ramsey: Drums
Vince Montana: Vibes
Larry Washington: Conga

The album (all other songs)

Patrick Adams: Bass, Guitar, Piano, Organ, Drums, Celeste, Moog Synthesizer, Timpani
Larry Blackmon: Drums on You & I, Find The One Who Loves You
Gordon Edwards: Bass
Harry Lookofsky: Concertmaster (all songs)

Charts

Singles

References

External links

1972 debut albums
Perception Records albums
Black Ivory albums